Nicholas Fred DeCarbo  (March 21, 1910 – August 21, 1991) was an American football player who was a guard in the National Football League (NFL) for one season in 1933.  He played college football for Duquesne University, and played professionally as a lineman in 11 games for the NFL's Pittsburgh Pirates (now known as the Pittsburgh Steelers) during the 1933 NFL season.  He attended New Castle High School in New Castle, Pennsylvania.

References

External links
Just Sports Stats

1910 births
1991 deaths
Players of American football from Pennsylvania
American football guards
Duquesne Dukes football players
Pittsburgh Pirates (football) players
People from New Castle, Pennsylvania